Old Mines Creek is a stream in Washington County in the U.S. state of Missouri. It is a tributary of Mineral Fork.

Old Mines Creek takes its name from the nearby community of Old Mines, Missouri.

See also
List of rivers of Missouri

References

Rivers of Washington County, Missouri
Rivers of Missouri